Addington is a surname. Notable people with the surname include:

 Anthony Addington (1713–1790), English physician and writer
 Crandell Addington (born 1938), American poker player, one of the founders of the World Series of Poker
 David Addington (born 1957), American lawyer, formerly chief of staff to Dick Cheney
 Henry Addington, 1st Viscount Sidmouth (1757–1844), Prime Minister of the United Kingdom from 1801 to 1804
 Henry Unwin Addington (1790–1870), British diplomat and civil servant
 Isaac Addington (1645–1719), functionary of various colonial governments of Massachusetts
 John Hiley Addington (1759–1818), British politician
 Stephen Addington (1729–1796), English dissenting clergyman and teacher
 Steve Addington (born 1964), American NASCAR crew chief
 Tom Addington (1919–2011), British Army soldier
 Tucker Addington (born 1997), American football player
 William Addington, 3rd Viscount Sidmouth (1824–1913), British politician

References